William Theodore Stecher (October 20, 1869 – December 26, 1926) was a professional baseball player who played pitcher in the Major Leagues in  for the Philadelphia Athletics.

External links

Major League Baseball pitchers
Philadelphia Athletics (AA) players
19th-century baseball players
Harrisburg Ponies players
Sunbury Pirates players
Baseball players from New Jersey
People from Riverside Township, New Jersey
Sportspeople from Burlington County, New Jersey
1869 births
1926 deaths